Rito Jiménez (1951 – 20 March 2021) was a Venezuelan politician.

He contested the 2020 Venezuelan parliamentary election on behalf of the United Socialist Party of Venezuela, and was elected to the National Assembly as a legislator representing Lara. He died in office on 20 March 2021, aged 70, of COVID-19.

References

1951 births
2021 deaths
Year of birth uncertain
Deaths from the COVID-19 pandemic in Venezuela
United Socialist Party of Venezuela politicians
People from Lara (state)
Members of the National Assembly (Venezuela)
21st-century Venezuelan politicians